William Edward Rose (1813–1893) founded the Rose Hotel, was a state senator, and a railroad president in South Carolina. He was elected to the South Carolina State Senate in 1868 during the Reconstruction era. He represented York County, South Carolina in the 48th general assembly, and in the 49th.

References

External links
 

1813 births
1893 deaths
South Carolina state senators
19th-century American politicians
Date of birth missing
Date of death missing
Place of birth missing
Place of death missing
American railroad executives
American hoteliers
19th-century American businesspeople